Howard Kingsley Ainsworth Gregory has served the Anglican Diocese of Jamaica as its bishop since 2012.

Gregory was educated at the University of the West Indies. He was ordained a deacon in 1973 priest in 1974.

Gregory was the chaplain of his old university. He was a then a lecturer at the Church Teachers’ College in Mandeville then warden at the United Theological College of the West Indies. He became Bishop of Montego Bay in 2002; he  was consecrated on 17 May 17 at the Cathedral of St. Jago de la Vega, Spanish Town.

Gregory was elected as the thirteenth Archbishop of the Church in the Province of the West Indies (CPWI) in May 2019.

Gregory is married and has one daughter.

Notes

 

21st-century Anglican bishops in the Caribbean
Anglican bishops of Jamaica
Living people
University of the West Indies alumni
Year of birth missing (living people)